Thomas Whiteside (April 21, 1918 – October 10, 1997) was an American journalist.

Born in Berwick-Upon-Tweed, Whiteside studied at the University of Chicago. During World War II, he worked for the Office of War Propaganda, compiling reports on Axis propaganda.  His work appeared in Newsweek, The New Republic, and The New Yorker.  He was instrumental in publicizing the damage of Agent Orange. He died in West Cornwall, Connecticut in 1997.

Awards
 1986 MacArthur Fellows Program

Works
The relaxed sell, Oxford University Press, 1954
The big puff, Constable, 1955
The tunnel under the Channel, Simon and Schuster, 1962
Alone through the dark sea, Braziller, 1964, 
An agent in place: the Wennerström affair, Viking Press, 1966 (reprint, Ballantine Books, 1983)
Twiggy and Justin, Farrar, Straus and Giroux, 1968, 
Defoliation, Ballantine Books, 1970, 
The withering rain: America's herbicidal folly, Dutton, 1971, 
Selling death: cigarette advertising and public health, Liveright, 1971, 
The Investigation of Ralph Nader, Pocket Books (December 1972), 
The Pendulum and the Toxic Cloud: The Course of Dioxin Contamination, Yale University Press (September 10, 1979),  
The Blockbuster Complex: Conglomerates, Show Business, and Book Publishing, Wesleyan University Press, 1981,

References

External links
Media Power: Who Is Shaping Your Picture of the World?, iUniverse, 2005, 

1918 births
1997 deaths
People from Berwick-upon-Tweed
University of Chicago alumni
MacArthur Fellows
American male journalists
20th-century American journalists
20th-century American writers
20th-century American male writers
British emigrants to the United States